Francisco José Fernández Mas (born 15 March 1979 in Valencia), known as Paco, is a Spanish professional footballer who plays as a goalkeeper.

External links

1979 births
Living people
Footballers from Valencia (city)
Spanish footballers
Association football goalkeepers
Segunda División players
Segunda División B players
Tercera División players
Atlético Levante UD players
Levante UD footballers
Novelda CF players
Algeciras CF footballers
UD Alzira footballers
Huracán Valencia CF players
CF Torre Levante players
CD Olímpic de Xàtiva footballers